Inukamigawa Dam is a gravity dam located in Shiga prefecture in Japan. The dam is used for irrigation and power production. The catchment area of the dam is 31.2 km2. The dam impounds about 35  ha of land when full and can store 4500 thousand cubic meters of water. The construction of the dam was completed in 1946.

References

Dams in Shiga Prefecture
1946 establishments in Japan